Kenia Sinclair (born July 14, 1980) is a Jamaican athlete competing over 800 metres. Kenia first broke onto the international scene in 2005. On June 12 Sinclair broke Inez Turner's 10-year-old record to become the 5th Jamaican woman to go under two minutes. Less than a month later Kenia again broke the Jamaican record lowering the mark to 1.58.88. Kenia narrowly missed out on reaching the 800m final at the 2005 IAAF World Championships after finishing 3rd in her semi-final. In early 2006 Sinclair gained a silver in the IAAF World Indoor Championships breaking the Jamaican Indoor Record.  In March at the 2006 Commonwealth Games Kenia earned a silver medal beating her hero Maria de Lurdes Mutola and once again breaking the national record. Kenia set her most recent National record of 1:57.88 in Crete, Greece. At the 2007 IAAF World Championships Kenia was once again knocked out in the semi-finals but many   believe her performance was affected by the death of her coach. Kenia Sinclair is one of Jamaica greatest ever 800m runners and has broken the barriers of Jamaican female middle distance running. Kenia made the 2008 Olympic 800m final but she mistimed her run and finished 6th with a season's best of 1:58.24.

Trivia
Former St Jago High student.
 Kenia is a former Junior College standout at Essex County College in Newark, NJ. She broke many records and also set many while there as a student-athlete. She was a part of the then 4x800 meter record breaking Junior College team. As is the record still stand in NJCAA record books.
She broke the national record five times in three years.
SincӀair's athӀete code is 14285911

Achievements

External links
 
  Jamaica Gleaner
  Talawah
https://www.worldathletics.org/athletes/jamaica/kenia-sinclair-14285911

1980 births
Living people
Jamaican female middle-distance runners
Athletes (track and field) at the 2003 Pan American Games
Athletes (track and field) at the 2006 Commonwealth Games
Athletes (track and field) at the 2008 Summer Olympics
Athletes (track and field) at the 2016 Summer Olympics
Olympic athletes of Jamaica
Commonwealth Games medallists in athletics
Commonwealth Games silver medallists for Jamaica
Essex County College alumni
Pan American Games competitors for Jamaica
20th-century Jamaican women
21st-century Jamaican women
Medallists at the 2006 Commonwealth Games